The second season of Dynasty originally aired in the United States on ABC from November 11, 1981 through May 5, 1982. The series, created by Richard and Esther Shapiro and produced by Aaron Spelling, revolves around the Carringtons, a wealthy family residing in Denver, Colorado.

Season two stars John Forsythe as millionaire oil magnate Blake Carrington; Linda Evans as his wife Krystle; Pamela Sue Martin as Blake and Alexis's headstrong daughter Fallon; Al Corley as Blake and Alexis's earnest son Steven; John James as Fallon's ex-husband Jeff Colby; Lloyd Bochner as Jeff's uncle, Cecil Colby; Pamela Bellwood as Claudia Blaisdel, the widow of Krystle's former lover; Heather Locklear as Krystle's troublemaking niece Sammy Jo; Lee Bergere as Carrington majordomo Joseph Anders; and James Farentino as psychologist Dr. Nicholas Toscanni. The season also introduced Joan Collins as Alexis Carrington, Blake's ex-wife and the mother of Fallon and Steven.

Development
In the first episode of the second season, titled "Enter Alexis", the mysterious witness from the season one finale removes her sunglasses to reveal British actress Joan Collins as a new arrival to the series. Series creators Richard and Esther Shapiro conceived the character as Blake's ex-wife Madeline, who they intended to be played by Sophia Loren for four to six episodes. Writers Eileen and Robert Mason Pollock, brought in for season two, renamed her Alexis, told Aaron Spelling that Loren was not right for the part, and warned him that "If you get rid of this character in four episodes, you are throwing away hundreds of millions of dollars." Collins said in 2018 that in addition to Loren, producers pursued Elizabeth Taylor and Jessica Walter. According to Collins, "They were waiting for Jessica until the very last minute, so they didn't cast me until two weeks before we started shooting."

Collins's Alexis Carrington blazed a trail across the show and its story lines. The additions of Collins and the Pollocks are generally credited with Dynastys subsequent rise in the Nielsen ratings. Esther Shapiro said the season one DVD commentary, "When Alexis came into it, it changed the tenor...And that's the way they are now on television: you have your traditional villain, and I think that plays to a different denominator." The Pollocks "soft-pedaled the business angle" of the show and "bombarded viewers with every soap opera staple in the book, presented at such a fast clip that a new tragedy seemed to befall the Carrington family every five minutes." The second season was ranked #19 in the United States.

Corley left Dynasty at the end of the second season in 1982, after complaining publicly in Interview that  "Steven doesn't have any fun... He doesn't laugh; he has no humor". Corley also lamented Steven's "ever-shifting sexual preferences", and stated that he wanted "to do other things".

Plot
The surprise witness at Blake's murder trial is his ex-wife Alexis, Fallon and Steven's mother. Her testimony about his character is damaging, and while Fallon is icy to the mother she feels abandoned her, Steven is drawn to Alexis. The former Mrs. Carrington's testimony notwithstanding, Krystle is immediately put off by Alexis's condescending attitude and manipulations. Later, Krystle's discovery that Alexis had caused her miscarriage by intentionally startling her horse with a gunshot settles Alexis as Krystle's implacable nemesis. Other new characters of the season are the psychiatrist Nick Toscanni, who tries to seduce Krystle while bedding Fallon and plotting against Blake; and Krystle's greedy niece Sammy Jo Dean (Heather Locklear), who marries Steven for his money. The season finale sees Blake left for dead on a mountain after a fight with Nick.

Cast

Main

 John Forsythe as Blake Carrington
 Linda Evans as Krystle Carrington
 Pamela Sue Martin as Fallon Carrington
 Pamela Bellwood as Claudia Blaisdel
 Al Corley as Steven Carrington
 John James as Jeff Colby
 Lloyd Bochner as Cecil Colby
 Heather Locklear as Sammy Jo Carrington
 Lee Bergere as Joseph Anders
 Joan Collins as Alexis Carrington
 James Farentino as Dr. Nick Toscanni

Recurring

 Peter Mark Richman as Andrew Laird
 Betty Harford as Hilda Gunnerson
 Virginia Hawkins as Jeanette Robbins
 Lance LeGault as Ray Bonning
 Hank Brandt as Morgan Hess
 Tim O'Connor as Thomas Crayford
 Paul Keenan as Tony Driscoll

Notable guest stars

 Lloyd Haynes as Judge Horatio Quinlan
 Brian Dennehy as Jake Dunham
 Diana Douglas as Mother Blaisdel
 John Saxon as Rashid Ahmed
 Viveca Lindfors as Adriana
 Christine Belford as Susan Farragut

Cast notes

Episodes

Reception
In season two, Dynasty was ranked #19 in the United States with a 20.2 Nielsen rating.

References

External links 
 

1981 American television seasons
1982 American television seasons
Dynasty (1981 TV series) seasons